Roland Feldhoffer (born 8 July 1962) is a German weightlifter. He competed in the men's middle heavyweight event at the 1988 Summer Olympics.

References

External links
 

1962 births
Living people
German male weightlifters
Olympic weightlifters of West Germany
Weightlifters at the 1988 Summer Olympics
Sportspeople from Heidelberg
20th-century German people